Smuggler (Conrad Josten) is a fictional character, a superhero appearing in American comic books published by Marvel Comics.

Fictional character biography
Conrad Josten is the youngest of the four Josten children born to farmers living outside Madison, Wisconsin. Conrad's oldest brother Carl was killed by a loan shark soon after the Thunderbolts were exposed as villains. Conrad's older sister Lindy was hit and killed by a drunk driver when she was 10 years old. Conrad's second oldest brother Erik became the super villain Power Man. Once news of Erik's arrest came out in the papers the Josten family could no longer do business in Madison and lost their farm. Conrad's parents took ill and died soon afterwards. Conrad ran away and changed his name and neither Erik or Carl stayed in contact with him. In the years to follow, Erik would take the villainous guises Smuggler and Goliath and eventually pretended to be a superhero named Atlas. Conrad still held a grudge against Erik and showed no hint of sadness when he saw his brother's seeming destruction at the hands of Scourge.

At the request of the Commission on Superhuman Activities, Conrad joined their Redeemer Program to become the Smuggler. What the Commission offered Conrad and what they actually gave him is up to debate. The CSA gave Conrad a suit that allowed him to access the Darkforce Dimension to melt into shadows. The Redeemers (led by Helmut Zemo who had taken control of the body of John Watkins III, the true Citizen V) eventually fought the Thunderbolts and they discovered his identity. After the battle was over the Thunderbolts were offered pardons (including Atlas, despite his apparent death) and disbanded. The Redeemers then began to operate out of the Thunderbolts' headquarters Mount Charteris in Burton Canyon, Colorado under the guidance of Captain America working for the CSA and S.H.I.E.L.D. In exchange they would have eventually been pardoned for their past crimes (there is some question as to if Conrad needed a pardon for himself or if needed one for Erik. Erik already got one from the CSA but Conrad might not have known that). The majority of the Redeemers were slaughtered by the villain Graviton and Conrad was believed to have been killed when Graviton shunted him into the sun. It was later discovered that Conrad had escaped into the darkforce dimension but became trapped there.

Baron Zemo eventually discovered Conrad's fate and arranged to have Blackout brought back from the dead so he could tap into the darkforce dimension and free Conrad. Zemo offered Atlas a choice, side with him and let him kill Genis (to save the universe) or he would leave Conrad in the darkforce dimension forever. Erik sided with Zemo and after Zemo killed Genis Erik was rewarded with Conrad's freedom. Conrad joined the Thunderbolts and seems to want to repair his relationship with his brother Erik.

As of the end of the current  run of Thunderbolts Conrad's Darkforce suit has been destroyed by the Wellspring energies that Zemo released.

Powers and abilities
Smuggler wears a suit that allows him to create apertures into the Darkforce Dimension allowing him to teleport himself and others and to elongate his limbs and extremities. He can also access the Darkforce Dimension to use the Darkforce energy as tendril-like grappling claws to grasp and hold opponents.

References

External links
 Smuggler at Marvel.com
 

Comics characters introduced in 2001
Fictional characters from Madison, Wisconsin
Fictional characters from Wisconsin
Fictional characters who can stretch themselves
Marvel Comics superheroes
Marvel Comics characters who can teleport